Playhouse Presents is an anthology series of self-contained TV plays, made by British broadcaster Sky Arts. The series started airing on 12 April 2012, on Sky Arts 1. Each episode is written by a different writer and stars a different cast. The second series began airing in April 2013. A third season began airing 1 May 2014.

Sky Arts announced that they were ordering a five-part spin-off of the third play, Nixon’s The One. They said the full cast, including Harry Shearer as Nixon and Henry Goodman as Kissinger, were slated to return for the series run, which was to be filmed in September 2012. The series was scheduled to broadcast in 2013.

The four-part adaptation of A Young Doctor's Notebook starring Jon Hamm and Daniel Radcliffe was also broadcast as under the Playhouse Presents banner in December 2012. It became the most successful series in the history of Sky Arts and a second series was commissioned, airing in late 2013.

Sky Arts announced two films, Foxtrot and Nightshift, for the Playhouse Presents strand in late 2013. While it initially appeared that these would be broadcast as one-offs, they ended up being aired as part of the third season. A Christmas special titled "Marked", starring Kiefer Sutherland, Stephen Fry, and Kevin McNally, was broadcast in December 2014.

Episodes

Series 1 (2012)

Series 2 (2013)

Series 3 (2014)

Broadcast
Playhouse Presents premiered on 4 January 2015 on BBC First.

References

External links

British drama television series
2012 British television series debuts